Imran Reza Ansari (born 7 March 1972) is a Kashmiri politician and a well known Shia cleric succeeding his father Iftikhar Hussain Ansari after later's death. He belongs to the influential Ansari family.
He won elections from the Pattan constituency and was nominated as Minister of Information Technology, Technical Education and Youth Services and Sports. Imran is the grandson of marhoom Molvi Jawad Ansari and also the nephew of Abid Hussain Ansari.

Early life and education
Imran Reza Ansari was born to Kashmir's influential Shia religious cleric Iftikhar Hussain Ansari on 7 March 1970. He is elder to his brother Irfan Reza Ansari and younger to his sister. Raza Ansari had his matriculation from Tyndale Biscoe School in Srinagar. He then went to Jamia Millia Islamia with arts as his subject. Later he had his masters from same institution, where he qualified Master's degree in political science.

Political career 

After death of his father Iftikhar Hussain Ansari in 2014, Imran Reza Ansari was fielded by Jammu and Kashmir People's Democratic Party at the  Pattan constituency where his father served before. In 2014 Jammu and Kashmir Legislative Assembly election, Imran Reza Ansari won from his constituency with more than 14000+ votes. After new government was formed by Jammu and Kashmir Peoples Democratic Party, Imran Ansari was declared minister of Information Technology, Technical Education, Youth Service and Sports. He has also served as the president of Jammu and Kashmir Cricket Association. Ansari ended the three decade long term of Farooq Abdullah, when he was newly elected as president of Jammu and Kashmir Cricket Association on 16 July 2016.

See also 
Iftikhar Hussain Ansari
Abid Hussain Ansari
Mufti Mohammad Sayeed
Sajjad Gani Lone

References 

Living people
1970 births
Kashmiri people
Jamia Millia Islamia alumni
Jammu and Kashmir Peoples Democratic Party politicians
Indian Shia Muslims
Jammu and Kashmir People's Conference politicians